Dave Mallow (born October 19, 1948) is a retired American voice actor.

Biography
Mallow's father worked in radio and television and was a 30-year on-air veteran at Chicago's WGN. After graduating from Maine South High School, Mallow attained a BFA in Theater Arts from Drake University in 1970. After a successful 12-year career as a radio personality in the Midwestern United States and New York City, he moved to Los Angeles in 1984 to pursue a career in voice acting that has included commercials, film dubbing, looping, narration, audio books, radio plays and voice characterization in numerous video games, toys and cartoons. He provided the daily intros and various monsters for Saban Productions, including the benevolent 'Baboo' in Mighty Morphin Power Rangers; Angemon, Gekkomon and Uppamon in Digimon: Digital Monsters and also is remembered for voicing Amarao in Digital Manga's FLCL, Herzog in the alternative reality game I Love Bees and Akuma in Street Fighter franchise among numerous others.

Roles

Anime

 Adventures on Rainbow Pond - Jonathan Jumper
 Ajin - The Minister
 Apocalypse Zero - Shimada Kazu
 Arc the Lad - Shu
 Argento Soma  - Base Guard, Doctor, Ground Control, Ulysses Transmission
 B-Daman Crossfire - Lightning Dravise, Emcee
 Babel II - Hikaru Homura
 Bastard!! - Messenger
 Big Rig Buddies - Lanky the Crane Truck (formerly), Felix's Dad
 Black Jack - Boardmember, Mikazuki Victim, Refugee, Relief Committee Representative, Villager C
 Blade of the Immortal - Sori
 Bleach - Kensei Muguruma, Aaroniero Arruruerie (Kaien), Kaien Shiba (after Kim Strauss), Inose
 Blood: The Last Vampire - Announcer, Ted
 Blue Dragon - Grankingdom Captain
 Blue Exorcist - Ernst Frederik Egin
 Burn-Up Scramble - Narrator
 Captain Harlock and the Queen of a Thousand Years - various
 Carried by the Wind: Tsukikage Ran - Lord Matsuzaka
 Code Geass: Lelouch of the Rebellion - Britannian Bridge Officer, Britannian Officer
 Code Geass: Lelouch of the Rebellion R2 - Chief Officer
 Computer Warriors - Scanner
 Cosmowarrior Zero - Mechanized Man 1, Mechanized Man 2, Nohara, Secretary
 Daigunder - Track Announcer
 Detatoko Princess - Barell, King/Morita
 Digimon series - Angemon/MagnaAngemon, Seraphimon, Upamon, Pegasusmon, Elecmon, Togemon, Ring Announcer, Gekomon, Numemon, Otamamon, Agent #1, Tokomon, Angemon, Piddomon, Vilemon, Grani
 Dragon Ball - Oolong (Dragon Ball) (MaoMao) (Harmony Gold dub)
 Durarara!! - Yoshida, Kanra
   Durarara!!x2 - Various
 Eagle Riders - Various
 Eiken - Shimada
 Eureka Seven - Jobs
 Eyeshield 21 - Stadium Announcer
 Hunter × Hunter – Gotoh
 Fist of the North Star - Hart, Guard Captain
 FLCL - Commander Amarao
 Flint the Time Detective - Coconaut
 Gad Guard - Black, Cop, Man with Briefcase, World Electro Doorman
 Galerians - Rainheart, Dr. Pascalle
 Gate Keepers - Opening Narrator
 Ghost in the Shell: Stand Alone Complex 2nd Gig - Gohda's Aide
 Ghost Slayers Ayashi - Nioya, Zusyo Okada
 Genma Wars - Chief Monkey
 Great Teacher Onizuka - Kouichi Igurashi
 Grenadier - Teppa's Father
 Gungrave - Evans, Gary
 Gun Frontier - Custodian, Painter
 GUNxSWORD - Chief
 Gurren Lagann - The Anti-Spiral
 Hand Maid May - various
 Heat Guy J - Casino Security Guard C, Hooligan C, Mask Maker, News Anchor, Researcher B, Shogun's Informant A, Thomas Park, Thug A
 Here is Greenwood - Bible Man, Lupin, Nagisa's Man D, Student with Glasses (Media Blasters Dub)
 Higurashi When They Cry - Kyousuke Irie
 Idol Project - Evie
 If I See You in My Dreams - Kujira, Niimi, Miho's Boss
 Immortal Grand Prix - Glass Jones, MC, Mechanic B, Private Investigator, Weatherman
 Iron Virgin Jun - Headguard
 Iznogoud - Iznogoud, Saltan, The Caliph
 Jin Jin and the Panda Patrol - Squawk, Rudy, Mugsy
 JoJo's Bizarre Adventure - Straizo
 JoJo's Bizarre Adventure: Stardust Crusaders - Narrator
 Journey to the Heart of the World - Louis
 Karas - Kamaitachi
 Kaze no Yojimbo - Arms Dealer, Hunter, Officer, Sugino
 Knights of Sidonia - Trainee
 Kurogane Communication - Cleric
 Kyo Kara Maoh! - Belar
 Last Exile - Casino Royale Dealer, Cicada, Goliath XO, Guild Watcher #3, Silvana Observation Deck Officer, Sunny Boy
 Lensman - Thorndyke
 Little Women - Additional Voices
 Lunar Legend Tsukihime - Male Student, Ride Attendant
 Macron 1 - Jet
 Mahoromatic: Something More Beautiful - Detective, Management Announcer, Management Board Member, Management Employee, Newscaster A, Teacher
 Mars Daybreak - Ginpetit
 Mega Man Star Force - Deranged Movie Star
 The Melody of Oblivion - Detective A, Elan Vital, Male Secretary, Man A, Miri's Butler, Vice Mayor
 Mirage of Blaze - Ujimasa Hojyo
 Mobile Suit Gundam: The Movie Trilogy - Narrator, Cain Sohn, Chris
 Monster - Peter Capek
 Mouse - Scientist, Woof, Policeman
 Naruto - Hoki, Tekka Uchiha
 New Getter Robo - Villager
 Nightwalker - Koji Ozaki
 Nodame Cantabile - Kozou Etou, Seiichirou Miyoshi
 Nura: Rise of the Yokai Clan - Muchi
 Otogi Zoshi - Onmyoji, Tabigeinin A
 Outlaw Star - Norman Starwind, Prison Security System, Space Race Announcer, Tendo King's Overseer
 Overman King Gainer - Toun
 Paranoia Agent - Hiranuma
 Phantom Investigators - Daemona's Dad
 Phantom the Animation - Master Scythe
 Phoenix - Kimite (Sun Chapter)
 Planetes - Chieftain, Narrator, Werner Locksmith
 Rozen Maiden - Seal
 Rurouni Kenshin - Sadojima Hoji, Udo Jin-e
 Saint Tail - Policeman, Sayaka's Father
 Saiyuki - Demon, Shikigami User, Thug C
 Samurai Champloo - Ichieimon, Ken, Lord Tamoto, Officer #2
 Samurai Girl Real Bout High School - Mr. Kinomiya, Setsura Kyogoku
 Scrapped Princess - General Peters-Stahl
 Street Fighter Alpha: Generations - Gouken
 Street Fighter IV: The Ties That Bind - Akuma
 Submarine 707R - Ichiro Suzuki
 Tenchi in Tokyo - Hotsuma, Space Police Announcer
 Tenchi Muyo! GXP - Kanemitsu Hirata, Misao Kuramitsu, Azusa Masaki Jurai
 Tenjho Tenge - Tagami
 Tenko and the Guardians of the Magic
 Tokko - Homeless Man, Lab Technician, Security Guard, TV News Reporter
 Trigun - Sheriff's Office Clerk
 Tsukihime, Lunar Legend - Male Student, Ride Attendant
 The Melancholy of Haruhi Suzumiya - Sports Announcer, Mask Merchant
 The Twelve Kingdoms - Gaishi, Ikuta, Sensei Watanabe, Gahou, Shukou
 Vampire Princess Miyu - Galerie Owner, Gas Station Manager, Reporter B, Yasuhiko Tachiki
 Vandread - Pyoro
 Vandread: The Second Stage - Patch, Pyoro
 When They Cry - Ichiro Maebara, Kyousuke Irie
 Witch Hunter Robin - Hattori
 X - Seishirou Sakurazuka
 Yukikaze - Ansel Rombart
 Yu-Gi-Oh! Zexal - Various
 Zatch Bell! - Yopopo, Kikuropu, Cut 'N' Paste
 Zetman - Jiro Nakata
 Zillion - NOZA Computer, Silo Complex Commander, Soldier

Animation
 The Return of Dogtanian - Dogtanian
 El Chavo - Mr. Beliarge, Manny the Mailman
 Grimm's Fairy Tale Classics - "Briar Rose" - The Prince
 Grimm's Fairy Tale Classics - "King Grizzlebeard" - King Grizzlebeard
 Grimm's Fairy Tale Classics - "Snow White and Rose Red" - Bear
 Lego Friends: Mia's Ranch Romance - Additional Voices
 Maple Town - Mr. Badger
 Noozles - Grandpa Benjamin Brown, Frankie
 Phil's Dance Party - Phil
 The Wisdom of The Gnomes - Pit

Live action
 Adventures in Voice Acting - Himself
 Big Bad Beetleborgs - Swamp Scumoid, Borgslayer (shared role with Bob Papenbrook)
 Beetleborgs Metallix - Shellator (voice)
 Drunken Master II - Wong Fei-Hung
 Dynamo Duck - Edison, Frostbite, Ivan Tobealonesky, Sean O'Connor
 Everybody Loves Raymond - Event Announcer (uncredited)
 Flipper - Computer Voice
 Hallo Spencer - Kasimir (voice)
  Jake & Blake - Fynk
 Just Shoot Me! - The Egg (computer voice)
 Mad Men - Ring Announcer / Season 4 "The Suitcase" (voice)
   Marseille - Pierre Chasseron
 Mighty Morphin Power Rangers - Baboo (as Colin Phillips), Series Announcer, Pudgy Pig, Grumble Bee (2nd voice), Lizzinator, Trumpet Top, Terror Blossom, Beamcaster, Evil Bookula (voices, all minus Baboo are uncredited)
 Power Rangers Zeo - Baboo, Video Vulture, Googleheimer (the Toy Robot), "Hosehead", Midas Monster (voices, all minus Baboo uncredited)
 Power Rangers Turbo - Mr Goorific (voice, uncredited)
 Power Rangers In Space - Termitus (voice, uncredited)
 Power Rangers Lost Galaxy - Gasser (uncredited), Magnetox (voices)
 Power Rangers: Lightspeed Rescue - Trifire (voice)
 Power Rangers: Time Force - Black Knight (uncredited), Commandocon (voices)
 Power Rangers: Wild Force - 2nd Narrator (uncredited), Vacuum Cleaner Org, Helicos (as David J. Mallow), Announcer (voices)
 Roseanne - Radio Voice
 Versus - Glasses
 Violetta - Ramallo (voice: English)
 VR Troopers - Air Stryker, Toxoid, Fistbot, Magician, Irradiator, Series Announcer
 World Series of Poker - The Discovery Channel
 Zeiram 2 - Bob (voice)

Films

 A Martian Christmas - VOX, Shopper
 An American Tail: The Treasure of Manhattan Island - Looper
 Castle in the Sky - Louis (original English dub)
 Cromartie High - The Movie - Masa (voice)
 Arthur's Missing Pal - TV Announcer
 Blood: The Last Vampire - Various
 Dawn of the Dead - Zombie Vocal EFX (uncredited)
 Digimon: The Movie - Angemon/Seraphimon, Upamon
 Digimon Adventure tri. - Angemon
 Dive Olly Dive and the Pirate Treasure - Pirate Captain
 Fist of the North Star - Heart (Streamline dub)
 First Snow - Radio Announcer (voice, uncredited)
 FernGully: The Last Rainforest - Additional Voice
 Forest Warrior - Bear Vocal Effects (uncredited)
 The Happy Cricket - Buffuno
 Kiki's Delivery Service - Dirigible Captain (Streamline Dub)
 Krippendorf's Tribe - Newscaster (voice, uncredited)
 Lensman: Secret of the Lens - Thorndyke
 Metropolis - Pero
 Mobile Suit Gundam F91 - Cain Sohn, Chris
 Nixon - Newscaster (voice, uncredited)
 Redline - Track Announcer
 'Til There Was You - Newscaster (voice, uncredited)
 Turbulence - Autopilot Voice (uncredited)
 The Waterboy - Sports Announcer (voice, uncredited)
 The L.A. Riot Spectacular - Newscaster (voice, uncredited)
 The Dragon That Wasn't (Or Was He?) - Mr. Tusker, Doctor Lockjaw, Newscaster (English dub)
 The Hungover Games - Talking Jay
 The Unborn - Devil Baby Vocal EFX (uncredited)
 John Carpenter's Vampires - Vampire Vocal EFX (uncredited)
 Windaria - Lunarian Court Member

Video games
 Battleship - Master Chief Petty Officer Scott Vickers, Lt. Commander Steve Metcalfe
 Bleach: The 3rd Phantom - Seigen Suzunami
 Call of Duty 4: Modern Warfare - "Baseplate"
 Call of Duty: Black Ops - President Richard Nixon
 Defiance - Weston Marx, Votan Rebel, Hammerhead Gretch
 Diablo III - Gharbad, Raziel the Dark One, Ghezrim, Serpent Magus, Goz' Turr the Torturer
 Digimon Rumble Arena - Seraphimon
 Hearthstone - The mistcaller, Sea Reaver, Spawn of Shadows, Mogor's Champion, Mukla's Champion
 Heroes of the Storm - Dragon Knight, Undead Miner
 I Love Bees - Herzog
 Klonoa - Joker, Royal Guard
 Marvel vs. Capcom 3 - Akuma
 Might and Magic: World of Xeen - Additional Voices
 Resident Evil 5 - HQ
 Resident Evil 6 - HQ
 Resistance 3 - Lester
 Samurai Champloo: Sidetracked - Hanaoka
 Space Siege - Dr. Edward DeSoto
 Street Fighter series - Akuma, Oni
 Ultimate Marvel vs. Capcom 3 - Akuma
 Warcraft series - Various to include: Azgalor, Brutallus, Gortok Palehoof, Lor'Themar Theron, Varkul the Unrelenting, Tortolla, Xevozz, Thermaplugg, Saurok, Verming, Thalnos, Amber Monster, Chief Salyis, Nhallish

Toy voice work
 Sonic Slam
 WWF Smackdown Megaphone
 Big Rig Buddies - Mattel
 Chameleon Crunch Game - Mattel
 Hot Wheels® Car Maker - Mattel
 Hot Wheels® K.I.T.T. Knight Industries Two Thousand - Knight Rider 30th Anniversary Special Edition

Audio book narration
  The Commission
  Rich Dad's Increase Your Financial IQ
  Rich Dad's Advanced guide To Real Estate Investing
  Rich Dad's Guide To The ABC's Of Property Management
  Rich Dad's Conspiracy Of The Rich
  The Political Fix
  The Problem with Sudden Dance
  Lies Chelsea Handler Told Me
  Secret Agent X: "The Torture Trust" - Radio Archives.Com
  So Good They Can't Ignore You - Why Skills Trump Passion in the Quest for Work You Love
  Word of Mouth Marketing: How Smart Companies Get People Talking
 The Kid: The Immortal Life of Ted Williams

ADR Staff

Writer/Adapter
 Adventures on Rainbow Pond - Harmony Gold
 Grimm's Fairy Tale Classics
 The Littl' Bits
 Maple Town Stories
 Maya the Bee
 Noozles
 Ox Tales
 The Return of Dogtanian
 Saban's Adventures of Peter Pan
 Saban's Adventures of Pinocchio
 Saban's Adventures of the Little Mermaid
 Saban's Tales of Little Women
 Saban's The Adventures of Tom Sawyer
 Saban's Gulliver's Travels
 Samurai Pizza Cats
 Sandokan (1992 animated series - BRB International)
 Swiss Family Robinson
 The Wisdom of The Gnomes
 The Hallo Spencer Show
 Wowser

Director
 Adventures on Rainbow Pond - Co-director
 Button Nose - ADR Director
 Eagle Riders - Co-director
 Honeybee Hutch - Voice Director
 Journey to the Heart of the World - Co-director
 Noozles - Co-director
 Saban's Tales of Little Women - Co-director
 Tenchi in Tokyo Co-director
 Wisdom of the Gnomes - Co-director
 The Return of Dogtanian - Co-director

Looping
 Air Force One
 Beauty and the Beast
 Breaking Bad
 Dark Water
 Dawn of the Dead
 ER
 First Snow
 Ghosts of Mars
 Life-Size
 Lois & Clark: The New Adventures of Superman
 Mad Men
 My Favorite Martian
 My So-Called Life
 S1m0ne
 Nixon
 Jerry Maguire
 Mystery Alaska
 'Til There Was You
 Turbulence
 The Waterboy
 Eraser
 Relativity
 Sisters (U.S. TV series)
 The Siege
 The Heist  - (1989 TV Movie)
 The Adventures of Brisco County, Jr.
 Krippendorf's Tribe
 John Carpenter's Vampires
 Rocky and Bullwinkle
 BASEketball - Bob Costas sound-alike

Radio - On-air personality
 KFMG-FM - Des Moines, Iowa
 KUDL-FM - Kansas City, Missouri
 WQIV-FM - New York, New York
 WKTU-FM - New York, New York
 WTFM-FM - New York, New York
 Cutler Comedy Network

Other crew
 The Unborn - Vocal Effects

References

External links
 
 
 

1948 births
American male television writers
American male video game actors
American male voice actors
American radio personalities
American television writers
Living people
Drake University alumni
American voice directors